SABSA may refer to:
 Saudi Arabian Boy Scouts Association
 Sherwood Applied Business Security Architecture, a framework and methodology for enterprise security an risk management
 South African Business Schools Association